Jeremy Diddler is a fictional character in James Kenney's 1803 farce Raising the Wind, and is said to have been based on an amusing importunist named Bibb, dubbed "half-crown Bibb".

A needy, artful swindler, "Jeremy Diddler" became a stock character in farce; the word "diddle" may be derived from him, or vice versa, and was a very common expression in the 19th and early 20th centuries.  

The character of Jeremy Diddler is discussed in some detail in Herman Melville's The Confidence Man: His Masquerade.

He appears in Thomas Haynes Bayly's novel David Dumps (chapter XV).

References

Fictional con artists
Male characters in theatre
Comedy theatre characters
Male characters in literature
Comedy literature characters
Theatre characters introduced in 1803
Characters in plays